Death planning may refer to:
 Estate planning
 Planning for end-of-life care